Largest cities in the state of Rio Grande do Sul, Brazil by population, in descending order:

References
 "Cidades@", Brazilian Institute of Geography and Statistics, Accessed on 2007-03-20.

Rio Grande do Sul
Rio Grande do Sul

de:Liste der Gemeinden in Rio Grande do Sul
pt:Anexo:Lista de municípios do Rio Grande do Sul por população